William Sterndale Case (24 August 1873 – 18 March 1922) was an English first-class cricketer.

Case was born at Oxford in August 1873 to the cricketer Thomas Case. He was educated at Winchester College, before going up to the Magdalen College, Oxford. He appeared in two first-class cricket matches, the first of which came for the Gentlemen of England against Oxford University at Oxford in 1895, before making his second appearance for the Marylebone Cricket Club against Oxford University at Oxford in 1896. In addition to playing first-class cricket, Case also played minor counties cricket for Oxfordshire between 1895–1906, making 23 appearances in the Minor Counties Championship. He died in March 1922 at St Giles', Oxford. His brother, Thomas, was also a first-class cricketer. His maternal grandfather was the composer William Sterndale Bennett.

References

External links

1873 births
1922 deaths
Cricketers from Oxford
People educated at Winchester College
Alumni of Magdalen College, Oxford
English cricketers
Gentlemen of England cricketers
Oxfordshire cricketers
Marylebone Cricket Club cricketers